The Mercedes-Benz MB 517 was a supercharged, four-stroke, V-12 diesel marine engine version of the MB 507; derived from the MB 503 gasoline engine. The MB 507 was also based on the Daimler-Benz DB 603 inverted V-12 aircraft engine, and shared an identical bore, stroke, and displacement. Unlike the gasoline-powered MB 503, the diesel-powered MB 507 did not use a supercharger.

Applications
Panzer VIII Maus V2

References

Mercedes-Benz engines
Engines by model
Diesel engines by model
V12 engines